This is a list of motorcycles produced under the Royal Enfield brand by the defunct original company, Enfield Manufacturing Company Ltd of Redditch, UK, and later users of the name, including the current user of the brand name, Royal Enfield (India) of Chennai, India.

Pre-WWI models

Inter-war models

WWII models 
Source:

Post-WWII models 
Source:

Indian-branded Royal Enfields (sold in USA from 1955 to 1960) 
Indian branded motorcycles included:

Enfield India Ltd. (1955 onwards) 
Enfield India was renamed to Royal Enfield Motors in 1995.

See also
List of AMC motorcycles
List of Ariel motorcycles
List of BSA motorcycles
List of Douglas motorcycles
List of Norton motorcycles
List of Triumph motorcycles
List of Velocette motorcycles
List of Vincent motorcycles

References 

Royal Enfield
Royal Enfield

de:Triumph (Motorrad)
fr:Triumph (moto)
it:Triumph
nl:Triumph (motorfiets)
ja:トライアンフ (二輪車)
sv:Triumph (mc)